Madaripur Stadium is located by the Madaripur Public Institution, Madaripur, Bangladesh.

See also
Stadiums in Bangladesh
List of football stadiums in Bangladesh
List of cricket grounds in Bangladesh

References

Cricket grounds in Bangladesh
Football venues in Bangladesh